The Finland national under-18 football team are a feeder team for the main Finland national football team.

UEFA European Under-18 Championship

UEFA European Under-18 Championship

Current squad 
 The following players were called up for the Under-19 Baltic Cup matches.
 Match dates: 9, 11 and 13 June 2022
 Opposition: ,  and Caps and goals correct as of:''' 11 June 2022, after the match against

Recent Callups

The following players has been called up during the last twelve months:

References

European national under-18 association football teams
Football in Finland